The Ruhrtriennale (compound of Ruhr and triennale "lasting 3 years"), also known as Ruhr Triennale, was founded in 2002 and is a music and arts festival in the Ruhr-area of Germany which runs between mid-August and mid-October, and happens in three-year cycles. The topics of the festival focus on contemporary social and global upheavals.

History
It was founded in 2002 by the government of North Rhine-Westphalia with Gerard Mortier, the impresario and former artistic director of the Salzburg Festival, as its founding director. The festival is organized into three-year cycles, each with its own theme and under different artistic directors.

Each yearly festival comprises 80 performances of 30 productions. Its central feature are the Kreationen (creations) – interdisciplinary productions uniting contemporary developments in fine art, pop, jazz and concert music. Another continuous element is the concert series, Century of Song, dedicated to the art of songwriting. The locations of the Ruhrtriennale are industrial heritage sites of the Ruhr area, which have been transformed into venues for music, theatre, literature and dance.

Artists who have appeared at the festival include Ariane Mnouchkine, Peter Brook, Robert Lepage, Bill Viola, Patrice Chéreau, Ilya Kabakov, Peter Sellars, Christian Boltanski, Bill Frisell, Patti Smith, Elvis Costello, Ryoji Ikeda, Saburo Teshigawara, Akram Khan, Cecilia Bartoli, Michal Rovner (2012), and Thomas Hampson.

Cycles and directors

References

External links 

Ruhr Triennale, Chronology

Music festivals in Germany
Culture of North Rhine-Westphalia
Ruhr